GoDigital Media Group (GDMG) is a diversified multi-national conglomerate founded in 2006 by Jason Peterson and headquartered in Los Angeles. GDMG focuses on intellectual property rights management through divisions in music, video networks, and brands (commerce). CEO Jason Peterson's “Content is King” philosophy for GoDigital closely resembles that of Sumner Redstone, the 80's media mogul that grew his father's drive-in theater business into a content-centric empire that included Viacom, Paramount Pictures and CBS.

Background
GoDigital Media Group was founded by CEO and Chairman Jason Peterson in 2006 as a digital music distributor.

In 2007 GDMG created a division named AdShare, the first social media monetization business identifying, tracking, and monetizing rights on YouTube.

In 2008, Peterson and GDMG created a digital video division eponymously named GoDigital, inc, that specialized in digital movie distribution. In January 2012, GoDigital, inc acquired Might Entertainment for its 800 film catalog creating a combined company with over 1,100 titles. In August, 2012 GoDigital, Inc. was majority sold to Preferred Ventures who made a control investment. Preferred Ventures then merged GoDigital inc with Variance Films in January 2014, forming a new theatrical movie distribution entity, Amplify.

In 2010, Peterson and GDMG commercialized their ContentBridge platform to offer cloud based digital supply chain and rights management under a SaaS model to major movie studios and networks. In 2014, ContentBridge won the 2014 Entertainment Merchant Association's  “Industry Leadership” Digital Award for software support for the SMPTE Interoperable Master Package (IMP), CableLabs and UltraViolet digital supply chain standards.

In 2012, GDMG's music distribution business was rebranded Cinq Music and the mandate was broadened to include distribution, publishing and record label activities.

In 2016, GDMG's AdShare unit acquired Primo Media to create VidaPrimo, the then largest Latin music only multi-channel network.

In 2017, GDMG created Latido Music as a free ad-supported linear Latin music television channel

Acquisitions and Growth
Starting in 2017:

 GDMG invested $20 million into its Cinq Music division, hired rap mogul Master P to be President of Urban Music and acquired 3x Grammy Award winning rapper T.I.'s catalog from Warner Music Group.

In 2018:

 GDMG subsidiary Cinq Music signed Janet Jackson to a record deal and released the single "Made for Now" featuring Daddy Yankee

In 2019:

 GDMG invested another $40 million into its Cinq Music division for music rights acquisitions to follow on to existing Latin repertoire from Anuel, Bad Bunny, Carin Leon, Natanel Cano and others.

In 2020:

 Cinq Music acquired the Beluga Heights Record Label including the catalogs of Sean Kingston and Jason Derulo for an eight figure sum.  
 GoDigital then also acquired Hispanic targeted multi-platform network mitu which along with the Latido Music channel forms the programming and production core of their networks division. With mitu, GoDigital and its business units have access to A-level content production.

In 2021: 

 GDMG bought YogaWorks, the largest Yoga studio business in the U.S., out of COVID- induced bankruptcy. The company purchased YogaWorks to transform the business model into a digital first subscription based business for health, wellness and longevity.  
 GDMG and MEP Capital (“MEP”) acquired Sound Royalties for high eight figures, the leading provider of financing solutions for music creators ranging from emerging artists, songwriters and producers, to platinum hitmakers such as DJ Khaled, Lil Wayne, Pitbull, Rich Robinson, and Wyclef Jean. Peterson stated in Music Business Worldwide his plans for GoDigital. “We have a vision for a billion dollar balance sheet of rights. We are raising tremendous amounts of money right now, we have a tremendous pipeline of acquisitions. There will be more news about deals and new financing.

In 2022:

 GDMG invested another $100 million into its Cinq Music division for music rights acquisitions, bringing GoDigital's total investment in Cinq Music to $160 million.
 GDMG's Commerce division acquired consumer brand Eastern Mountain Sports and its physical retail business alongside New England retailer Bob's Stores for $70 million.

Business Units
Divisions include: Music, Video Networks, and Commerce (named GDMG Brands). Business units within divisions are:

Music:

 AdShare is a social media (primarily YouTube content) monetization service for entertainment industry rights-holders.
 Cinq Music is a distributor, label and publisher known for its Hip Hop/R&B repertoire from Jason Derulo, T.I., and Janet Jackson as well as Latin repertoire from Anuel, Bad Bunny, Carin Leon, Natanel Can and others. 
 Sound Royalties the leading provider of financing solutions for music creators ranging from emerging artists, songwriters and producers, to platinum hitmakers such as DJ Khaled, Lil Wayne, Pitbull, Rich Robinson, and Wyclef Jean.

Networks:

 Latido Music as a free ad-supported linear Latin music television channel
 mitu is a HIspanic targeted multi-platform network
 YogaWorks is an online subscription Yoga network
 ContentBridge (ContentBridge LLC) is a supply chain management (SCM), digital rights management (DRM), and encoding software provider for the entertainment industry.

Commerce:

 GoDigital Brands is a vertically integrated brand IP management division of GDMG that manages Eastern Mountain Sports, Bob's Stores, the mituShop (the online store on mitú), and the soon to launch line of fitness clothing, mats, blocks and straps from YogaWorks.

References

External links 
 

Film distributors of the United States
Digital rights management systems
Digital audio distributors
Video on demand services
Entertainment companies based in California
Holding companies of the United States
Companies based in Santa Monica, California
Entertainment companies established in 2005
Holding companies established in 2005
Mass media companies established in 2005
2005 establishments in California